Ewen Vernal (born 27 February 1964) is a Scottish musician.

Born in Glasgow to a musical family, Vernal began taking piano lessons at 8 years old — inspired by a Beatles-singing mother and a choir-leading, saxophone-playing father. Singing competitions and local talent contests followed, but it was not until his teenage years that the bass guitar became the focus of his musical aspirations. Discovering an old guitar in the family loft with only a single low E-string left, he started to pick out bass-lines from favourite records, finally graduating to the real thing at 16 years old.

From the early 1980s, Vernal began playing in a variety of Glasgow-based bands and some jazz residencies throughout Scotland until, after some persuasion from their drummer, joined newly signed Deacon Blue in the autumn of 1986—until 1994, the band enjoyed worldwide success. In 1997 Vernal joined Capercaillie, of which he is still a member.

He has appeared with the Scottish progressive rock singer Fish, English folk star Kate Rusby, Hue and Cry, Lou Reed, Michael Brecker, Chris Rea, and many more.

He lives in the Netherlands with his Dutch girlfriend and has three children.

References

External links

Ewan Vernal official website

1964 births
Living people
Scottish pop musicians
Scottish bass guitarists
Musicians from Glasgow
Scottish expatriates in the Netherlands
Capercaillie (band) members
Deacon Blue members